Harold Raines Cameron (10 October 1912 – 8 October 2000) was a New Zealand cricketer. He was a right-handed batsman who played for Otago.

Cameron was born at Dunedin in 1912, the younger brother of Donald Cameron who also played for Otago. He was educated at Otago Boys' High School and worked as a sales manager.

Cameron made a single first-class appearance for the Otago during the 1939–40 season in a Plunket Shield match against Wellington. From the upper-middle order, he scored 26 runs in the first innings in which he batted, and 18 runs in the second. He had first played representative cricket for the side in the 1935–36 season match against Southland, and played a total of five times for Otago, including three times against Southland and in a match in March 1939 against a touring English side. He later became an Otago selector.

Cameron died in 2000 at Auckland. He was 87. An obituary was published in the New Zealand Cricket Annual the following year.

References

1912 births
2000 deaths
New Zealand cricketers
Otago cricketers